Bacteridium is a genus of sea snails, marine gastropod mollusks in the family Pyramidellidae, the pyrams and their allies.

Distribution
Most of the marine species within this genus occur in the Caribbean Sea and the Gulf of Mexico, with the exception of Bacteridium resticulum being situated off the west coast of Africa and its countries, Angola, Namibia and Gabon.

Species
There are four known species within the genus Bacteridium, these include:
 Bacteridium bermudense (Dall & Bartsch, 1911)
 Bacteridium carinatum (de Folin, 1870)
 Bacteridium resticulum (Dall, 1889)
 Bacteridium vittatum (A. Adams, 1861)

References

 Vaught, K.C. (1989). A classification of the living Mollusca. American Malacologists: Melbourne, FL (USA). . XII, 195 pp
 Rolán E., 2005. Malacological Fauna From The Cape Verde Archipelago. Part 1, Polyplacophora and Gastropoda.

External links
 To World Register of Marine Species

Pyramidellidae